The Flipside of Dominick Hide is a British television play first transmitted on BBC1 on 9 December 1980 as part of the Play for Today series.

Peter Firth stars in the title role as a time traveller from Earth's future who illegally visits the London of 1980 to search for an 'ancestor' and finds a world very different from the one he left behind. The story concludes with a plot twist involving a causal loop, a popular concept in time-travel fiction.

Plot summary
In 2130, Earth has attained a clean, safe and anaesthetised future. Dominick is a time traveller whose job is to observe transport systems on the 'flipside' – the era before the Time Barrier was broken. Dominick's 'Circuit' (the period in time and space he must observe) is London 1980, where he believes he may have an ancestor – his great-great-grandfather, also named Dominick Hide. Breaking the rules, Dominick lands on the flipside to search for his great-great-grandfather.

London of 1980 is a different place to London of 2130 and Dominick is unprepared for the amazing culture shock of Portobello Road. He has no money and almost no idea how to behave. He concocts a story about finding a 'distant relative' and to avoid suspicion, calls himself Gilbey, after a brand of Gin. While he is on the flipside, he relies on the kindness of strangers, including the owner of a clothes shop, Jane Winters.

After an unsuccessful visit to the flipside, Dominick returns to 2130 determined to try again. Dominick tells his wife, Ava, that he plans to visit the flipside. She is upset and confused and asks him not to go. Despite the risks involved and the promise of trouble from his superior, Caleb Line, Dominick visits the flipside again. While he is there and against all sense, Dominick begins a relationship with Jane.

Still Dominick has not found his great-great-grandfather but now his visits seem to be more concerned with seeing Jane than with finding the elusive 1980 Dominick. They spend a weekend together at a guest house in Herne Bay where his flying saucer has been taken. As a result, Jane becomes pregnant. When Dominick learns this, he goes to Caleb Line to own up.

Caleb reveals that he was aware, all the time, of what Dominick was doing. He sanctioned it because Dominick Hide is the victim of a "genetic time-slip" – he is his ancestor. The child Jane is carrying will be Dominick's great-grandfather.

Caleb tells Dominick that further landings on the flipside will not be permitted, officially, implying that he trusts Dominick enough to turn a blind eye to further landings. Having narrowly avoided causing a fatal accident on a previous landing, Dominick realises the danger involved, and decides to visit the flipside once more, where he provides for Jane and his son by fetching them the following week's newspaper, from which Jane can use the soccer results to win the football pools. He explains that this will be the last time he can visit the flipside and says a sad farewell to his great-great-grandmother. Jane watches Dominick take off in his flying saucer, convinced at last that his story is true. The closing scenes show Jane recording her son Dominick at Herne Bay in 1988 and Dominick and Ava walking and laughing in the surf at the Herne Bay of 2130 with their own baby.

Cast

 Peter Firth – Dominick Hide
 Caroline Langrishe – Jane
 Pippa Guard – Ava
 Patrick Magee – Caleb Line
 Trevor Ray – Alaric
 Sylvia Coleridge – Great Aunt Mavis
 Jean Trend – Helda
 Timothy Davies – Jim Bone
 Denis Lawson – Felix
 Bernadette Shortt – Midge
 Tony Melody – Harry
 Bill Gavin – Brian
 David Griffin – Karl
 Karl Howman – Geoffrey
 Jenny Donnison – Carole
 Michael Carter – 1st Youth
 Phil Davis – 2nd Youth
 Mark Wingett – 3rd Youth
 Nicholas McArdle – Policeman
 Sylvia Brayshay – Ida
 Colin Cunningham – Gordon
 David Beale – Barman
 Gary Bramble – Jonathan
 Sarah Carthy – Anxious Mother
 Ysanne Churchman – Soo (voice)
 Myrtle Devenish – Market Woman
 James Gilbey – George
 Andrew MacLaughlan – Commuter
 Jason Savage – Young Dominick
 James R B Dennis - Couples baby at end of film
 Robert Spencer – Hologram Musician
 Roderick Skeaping – Hologram Musician
 Andrew van der Beek – Hologram Musician
 Mitchell Dalton – Guitarist

Music
The play's theme, "You'd Better Believe It, Babe" was written by Rick Jones, and performed by his band, Meal Ticket.

Another Flip for Dominick
The play was successful enough for a sequel to be commissioned and Another Flip For Dominick was broadcast in 1982. The original play was repeated the week before the sequel aired. Neither play was shown again on British television until 26 February 2006, when The Flipside of Dominick Hide was broadcast on BBC Four to tie in with a series of programmes about time. The two dramas were released as a double VHS video pack in 1991 and on region 2 DVD in 2005.

See also
 Goodnight Sweetheart

External links
 TV Cream review of Flipside and Another Flip.

References

1980 television plays
BBC television dramas
British science fiction television shows
Play for Today
Fiction set in 1980
Fiction set in 1988
Fiction set in the 2130s
1980 films
1980s English-language films